Sharfuzzaman Jahangir is a Bangladesh Nationalist Party politician and a former member of parliament for Gopalganj-1.

Career
Jahangir was elected to parliament from Gopalganj-1 as a Bangladesh Nationalist Party candidate on 15 February 1996.

In 2018, Jahangir was nominated for the 11th Jatiya Sangshad elections from Gopalganj-1. His nomination was opposed by supporters of Mahbubur Rahman who vandalized the Bangladesh Nationalist Party office in Gulshan.

References

Bangladesh Nationalist Party politicians
Date of birth missing (living people)
6th Jatiya Sangsad members